Richelor Sprangers (born 10 February 1998) is a Haitian football player who plays for Dutch club SC Kruisland. He also holds Dutch citizenship.

Club career
He made his professional debut in the Eerste Divisie for NAC Breda on 25 November 2016 in a game against SC Cambuur.

International career
Sprangers made his debut for the senior Haiti national football team in a 3-3 2017 Kirin Challenge Cup tie with Japan on 10 October 2017.

Personal life
Sprangers was adopted by a Dutch couple when he was 4.

References

External links
 
 

1998 births
Sportspeople from Port-au-Prince
Haitian footballers
Haiti international footballers
Haiti under-20 international footballers
Haitian emigrants to the Netherlands
Naturalised citizens of the Netherlands
Dutch adoptees
Dutch footballers
Dutch people of Haitian descent
Living people
NAC Breda players
Helmond Sport players
SC Telstar players
Eredivisie players
Eerste Divisie players
Association football wingers